V-NOVA is a multinational IP and Technology company headquartered in London, UK. It is best known for innovation in data compression technology for video and images. V-Nova has partnered with large organizations including Sky, Xilinx, Nvidia, Eutelsat, and Amazon Web Services to provide its video compression technology.

History
V-NOVA was founded in 2011 by Guido Meardi, Pierdavide Marcolongo and others. In 2012, Mr Federico Faggin was among V-NOVA’s investors and founding members.

In 2016, Sky acquired a minority stake in V-NOVA for £4.5 million [8], and Eutelsat subsequently acquired a minority stake for an undisclosed amount. In the same year, Eutelsat deployed V-NOVA's technology for the 4K contribution feeds of the UEFA Euro Championship 2016 and, subsequently, acquired a minority stake for an undisclosed amount. Also in 2016, V-NOVA became a member of the Society of Motion Picture and Television Engineers.

In 2017, V-NOVA acquired the entire Faroudja patent portfolio to improve its Perseus codec.

In April 2019, V-NOVA technology was selected by MPEG for the working draft of the MPEG-5 codec enhancement standard. In the same year V-Nova became a member of the Advanced Television Systems Committee.

In 2020, V-NOVA and Amazon Web Services collaborated.

In May 2021, V-NOVA announced its partnership with SOUTHWORKS for LCEVC Integration Services.

In June 2021, V-NOVA partnerred with D-Orbit and Unibap to demonstrate VC-6 for on-orbit satellite imagery acceleration. The satellite was launched in Summer 2021. In July, multiple professional investors, including Intesa's Venture Capital arm Neva SGR, invested  €33m into V-NOVA.

In November 2021, V-NOVA and PresenZ released a Six Degrees of Freedom (6DoF) movie on the Steam Store. The movie uses V-NOVA’s point-cloud compression technology combined with 6DoF volumetric movie format from PresenZ.

In January 2022, SBTVD Forum approved a selection of technologies for SBTVD 3.0 which include MPEG-5 LCEVC, V-NOVA & Harmonic Inc.’s submission.

Technology
In 2015, the company announced a new digital data-encoding technology based on multi-layer coding, parallel processing and deep learning called Perseus for efficient video streaming with a focus on enabling UHD/4K services at lower bandwidths. It was claimed that it could be streamed to TVs and other devices using only around 50% of the bandwidth required by existing streaming technologies.

V-NOVA’s technology was later selected to provide the essential IP for the ISO/IEC 23094-2 standard MPEG-5 Part 2 Low Complexity Enhancement Video Coding (LCEVC), a codec-agnostic enhancement codec that can be combined with other video codecs to improve their coding and processing efficiency. It also maintains compatibility with the device ecosystem of the enhanced codec.

V-NOVA also developed another international standard codec, SMPTE VC-6 ST 2117, aimed at professional video and Artificial Intelligence applications.

In April 2021, MPEG Video validated the Verification Test of LCEVC (Low Complexity Enhancement Video Coding) standard ((ISO/IEC 23094-2). Test results tended to indicate an overall benefit also when using LCEVC to enhance AVC, HEVC, EVC and VVC.

Awards
The CSI Awards recognized V-NOVA as Best Digital Video Processing Technology in 2015 and 2017. V-NOVA was named Best of Show by the TV Technology Awards for four consecutive years in 2015, 2016, 2017, & 2018. It was also named Best of Show for its PERSEUS-powered Universal Media Player by TVB Europe in 2015, 2016, and 2017.

In 2016, the Diplomatic Council Awards named V-NOVA as Global Media Innovator. V-NOVA was recognized for its point cloud compression scheme by the Advanced Image Society at the 12th annual Entertainment Technology Lumiere Awards in 2022.

References

2011 establishments in England
Companies established in 2011
Data compression software
Information technology companies
Companies based in London